Luis Alberto Santibáñez Díaz (7 February 1936 – 5 September 2008) was a Chilean football manager.

As a team coach he won the Chilean title four times, once with Unión San Felipe (1971) and three times with Unión Española (1973, 1975, and 1977).

He served as manager of the Chile national football team between 1977 and 1982, which included qualification for the 1982 FIFA World Cup in Spain. There Chile was eliminated in the first round, in a group with Algeria, Austria and West Germany, losing all three matches.

Honours

Club
Unión San Felipe
 Segunda División de Chile: 1971
 Primera División de Chile: 1972

Unión Española
 Primera División de Chile (3): 1973, 1975, 1977

Barcelona Sporting Club
 Serie A de Ecuador: 1985

References

External links
 Luis Santibáñez at PartidosdeLaRoja 
 Weltfussball Profile  

1936 births
2008 deaths
People from Antofagasta
Chilean football managers
Chilean expatriate football managers
Deportes Antofagasta managers
Coquimbo Unido managers
Unión San Felipe managers
Unión Española managers
Chile national football team managers
O'Higgins F.C. managers
Club Deportivo Universidad Católica managers
Universidad de Chile managers
Huachipato managers
Barcelona S.C. managers
Filanbanco managers
Deportes La Serena managers
Santiago Wanderers managers
Deportes Temuco managers
Everton de Viña del Mar managers
LDU Portoviejo managers
Al-Arabi SC (Qatar) managers
San Marcos de Arica managers
Arturo Fernández Vial managers
Chilean expatriate sportspeople in Ecuador
Chilean expatriate sportspeople in Qatar
Expatriate football managers in Ecuador
Expatriate football managers in Qatar
1979 Copa América managers
1982 FIFA World Cup managers
Chilean Primera División managers
Qatar Stars League managers
Primera B de Chile managers